Itumbiara explanata is a species of beetle in the family Cerambycidae. It was described by Henry Walter Bates in 1885, originally under the genus Isomerida. It is known from Panama.

References

explanata
Beetles described in 1885